The Redfern All Blacks, also known as RABs or Redfern, are an Indigenous Australian semi-professional rugby league club based in Redfern, New South Wales, They are a part of the South Sydney District Junior Rugby Football League.

History
Redfern All Blacks is the oldest Indigenous Australian rugby league club in Australia. It was co-founded in 1938 by Bill Onus and Wesley Simms, during  the Great Depression. Some reports suggest that the club was officially established by a group of non-Aboriginal and Aboriginal people in 1944.

The club, often referred to as RABs or Redfern, was named after their black guernseys, part of the uniform provided by the South Sydney District Junior Rugby Football League in their first playing season. At the time the club was formed, Aboriginal Australians were denied rights afforded to other Australians.  Socially, culturally and politically, the club was important to many Indigenous Australians in Redfern at the time, and the club today is central to the history of Aboriginal Redfern.

In 1969, Redfern's rugby team had already made a name for itself, and the team were invited to play in New Zealand against the local Maori team in 1971. The All Blacks left a significant impression on the Kiwis, defeating the Maori team in a number of games.

In 1973, the Redfern All Blacks became one of the founding member clubs that formed the inaugural NSW Koori Knockout in which seven teams participated.

Notable team members
 Bobby McLeod
 Michael Mundine
 Tony Mundine
 Shane Phillips, CEO of Tribal Warrior

Notable players to play for Redfern All Blacks
 Mervyn "Boomanulla" Williams
 Matthew Allwood
 Josh Addo-Carr
 Andrew Dunemann
 Solomon Haumono
 Greg Inglis
 Nathan Merritt
 Ron Merritt 
 Tony Merritt
 Anthony Mundine
 Wes Patten
 Reece Robinson
 Travis Robinson
 Gorden Tallis
 Darrell Trindall
 Dean Widders 
 Jonathan Wright

Honours and records
South Sydney District Junior Rugby Football League (A Grade) 
Six: 1974, 1987, 2015, 2016, 2017, 2018
NSW Koori Knockout Men Titles
Eight: 1972, 1973, 1978, 1979, 1992, 1993, 2015, 2016
Koori vs. Murri Interstate Challenge
One: 2017
NSWRL Women's Premiership Titles 
Two: 2005, 2017
NSW Koori Knockout Women Titles
Five: 2010, 2011, 2014, 2015, 2016, 2017

2018 A Grade Squad

References

Further reading
 Sportingpulse
 Redfern Oral History - RABs page
 Portrait of the Redfern All Blacks 1979 Portrait by Michael Riley
 Jackie Hartley, Black, White... And Red? The Redfern All Blacks Rugby League Club in the Early 1960s, Labour History, No. 83 (Nov., 2002), Australian Society for the Study of Labour History, Inc.
 John Lester, You can take the black kid out of Redfern but you can't take the Redfern out of the black kid!, presentation to Perspectives on Urban Life: Connections and Reconnections AIATSIS National Indigenous Studies Conference 2009.

External links

 
 

Rugby league teams in Sydney
Indigenous Australian sport
Rugby clubs established in 1944
1944 establishments in Australia
Redfern, New South Wales